Princ Çali (born 29 August 1994 in Tiranë) is an Albanian footballer who currently plays as a goalkeeper for KF Luzi i Vogël 2008 in the Kategoria e Dytë.

Early life
Çali's father is called Baktashi. He trained in the Italian city of Bari at the age of 17 and, upon return to Albania, was discovered by Agustin Kola, a former international footballer for Albania.

Honours

Club

Tirana
 Albanian Supercup: (1) 2017

References

External links
Princ Çali at FSHF

1994 births
Living people
Footballers from Tirana
Albanian footballers
Association football goalkeepers
KF Tirana players
KS Kastrioti players
KF Adriatiku Mamurrasi players
Besa Kavajë players
KF Luz i Vogël 2008 players
Kategoria Superiore players
Kategoria e Parë players